Stellar (stylised stellar*) is a New Zealand pop/rock band led by vocalist Boh Runga, sister of acclaimed recording artist Bic Runga. They have had four RIANZ top 10 singles (the highest being "Every Girl" at  3) and two No. 1 albums. The band's signature song is "Violent", which at the 2000 New Zealand Music Awards won the Single of the Year award, as well as winning Runga an award for best Songwriter. The band won seven awards, among them the Best Album award for their debut, Mix. This was followed up by 2001's Magic Line and 2006's Something Like Strangers. The band officially disbanded in 2010 after releasing their greatest hits compilation, and reformed in 2017.

Formation
In 1992, musicians Boh Runga and Andrew Maclaren moved to Auckland from Christchurch and recorded the single "Ride" with guitarist Joel Haines. 
The song featured in the short film Headlong by Simon Raby, but the collaboration with Joel Haines did not last. 1994 to 1995 saw Runga and Maclaren recruit guitarist Simon McCormack, followed by bass player Kurt Shanks to form a four-piece, at that time the name Stellar was chosen and the first line up of the band began writing, recording and gigging around Auckland.

Simon McCormack left the band in 1997 and was replaced by a series of guitar players including Derek Solomon before Chris Van de Geer, who had worked as sound engineer on some of the band's demos, took over. In 1998 the band signed on with Sony BMG music NZ, later that year they released their first commercial single "What You Do (Bastard)". 1999 saw their first album release Mix, then the second-highest selling NZ album ever. The album was produced by ex-Thompson Twins singer Tom Bailey.

Mix would go on to gain Stellar numerous accolades at New Zealand's 2000 Tui awards. It was also released in Australia, and resulted in Stellar being a tour support for Alanis Morissette and Garbage. An extended version of Mix was also released, which featured a CD-ROM of three of their music videos.

In 2001 a follow-up album was released, Magic Line, a far more pop-rock based album than their first. After the release of four singles between 2001 and 2003, the band took an extended break due to different band members' solo projects before reforming.

2006 saw the release of their third album Something Like Strangers, producing the singles "Whiplash" and "For a While", the latter featuring Andy Lovegrove of the band Breaks Co-Op. The band then returned to their solo projects before reuniting for one last time in October 2010 for the release of The Best of Stellar*.

The band recently reformed in 2017, playing a cover of Sharon O'Neill's 1983 single"Maxine" at the New Zealand Music Awards that same year. Since then, Stellar have been playing in gigs such as the Marlborough Wine and Food Festival in 2019, and the Peachy Keen music festival in 2021.

Discography

Albums

Singles

References

External links
Official site (Currently inactive)
Boh Runga Interview – eSpy Magazine hijacked domain, no longer owned by Bic Runga as of 2014-06-08

APRA Award winners
New Zealand pop music groups
New Zealand pop rock groups
Musical groups established in 1994
Musical groups disestablished in 2010